This is the full discography of Portuguese band Blasted Mechanism.

Studio albums

EPs

Singles

DVD

References 

Discographies of Portuguese artists